Juan Ferney Otero Tovar (born 26 May 1995) is a Colombian professional footballer who plays as a forward for Spanish Segunda División club Sporting Gijón on loan from América.

References

External links 
 Siguetuliga profile
 

1995 births
Living people
Association football forwards
Colombian footballers
Colombia youth international footballers
Colombia under-20 international footballers
2015 South American Youth Football Championship players
Categoría Primera A players
Tercera División players
Argentine Primera División players
Ligue 1 players
Liga MX players
Deportivo Pereira footballers
Independiente Santa Fe footballers
Fortaleza C.E.I.F. footballers
Deportivo Fabril players
Estudiantes de La Plata footballers
Amiens SC players
Santos Laguna footballers
Sporting de Gijón players
Colombian expatriate footballers
Colombian expatriate sportspeople in Argentina
Colombian expatriate sportspeople in Spain
Colombian expatriate sportspeople in France
Expatriate footballers in Argentina
Expatriate footballers in Spain
Expatriate footballers in France
Expatriate footballers in Mexico
Sportspeople from Chocó Department